John Óge Kirwan (aka Jhonock Kirwan), fl. 1530–1531, Mayor of Galway.

The Ó Ciardhubháin family moved from Dunmore, County Galway to Galway town in the 1480s following a land dispute with Baron Athenry. The then head of the family was William Ó Ciardhubháin, whose eldest son, Thomas, became Mayor in 1534, while his second son, Patrick, became first Warden of Galway.

John Óge's relationship to these men is unknown, but he was the first member of the family to attain significant political office in the Anglo-Irish town of Galway.

References
 History of Galway, James Hardiman, Galway, 1820.
 Old Galway, Maureen Donovan O'Sullivan, 1942.
 Henry, William (2002). Role of Honour: The Mayors of Galway City 1485-2001. Galway: Galway City Council.  
 Martyn, Adrian (2016). The Tribes of Galway: 1124-1642

Mayors of Galway
16th-century Irish politicians